Jens Falkenberg (6 May 1875 – 26 March 1963) was a Norwegian equestrian. He was born in Kristiansand. He competed at the 1912 Summer Olympics in Stockholm, and at the 1920 Summer Olympics in Antwerp.

References

External links

1875 births
1963 deaths
Sportspeople from Kristiansand
Equestrians at the 1912 Summer Olympics
Equestrians at the 1920 Summer Olympics
Olympic equestrians of Norway
Norwegian male equestrians
20th-century Norwegian people